"Make Me Yours" is a 1967 song written by Bettye Swann (Betty Jean Champion) and produced by Arthur Wright, which became a crossover hit for the Louisiana-born Swann. The single went to number one on the Billboard "Hot R&B" chart for two weeks in July 1967 and also peaked at number twenty-one on the pop singles chart.

Chart positions

Other versions
The song has been recorded by several artists:
Z.Z. Hill recorded it as an album cut for his 1967 release, A Whole Lot of Soul
In 1968, Mary Wells, covered it on her album, Servin' Up Some Soul 
Ann Peebles on 1969 album, This is Ann Peebles
In 1979, Denise LaSalle covered as part of a medley with ""Precious, Precious" and "Trapped by a Thing Called Love", on her album, Unwrapped 
In 1979, Jackie Moore released it as single, peaking at #72 on the US, R&B chart
Motown group, High Inergy for their 1980 album Hold On from which it was the sole single release peaking at #68 R&B. 
Vaneese Thomas on her Soul Sister Vol 1 CD in 2009 
Syleena Johnson on herRebirth of Soul CD in 2017.

References

1967 singles
Jackie Moore songs